Niche: A Genetics Survival Game is an indie simulation video game developed and published by Stray Fawn Studio, and was released on Steam Early Access for Microsoft Windows, Mac OS, and Linux-based systems on September 15, 2016 after a successful Kickstarter crowd-funding campaign. Its main aim is to breed certain traits or genes into a group of canine or feline creatures to make the pack genetically perfect for its environment.

Gameplay 
The game starts off with the player choosing story mode, a quick how-to tutorial or sandbox mode, where the player chooses their animals and terrain for their tribes and environment and a short cut-scene of a tribe of nichelings living on an island. A large bird takes a child niche and tries to fly off with him but he falls onto a random island. This starts off the game by playing as a nicheling named Adam and the tutorial level. Game play and turns are organized into "days" which gives each animal a few actions of play each day.

Game Mechanics 
Niche's game mechanics were inspired by population genetics and effectively provide what is considered a fairly realistic genetic gaming experience. Animals can perish due to illness, injury, and even old age, so learning what will help them thrive with consideration to their living environment is key to not only building a solid tribe, but winning the game as well. Niche simulates over 100 genes, houses 4 different biomes with each having their very own predators, plants, and prey. Within the 100 available genes, there are characteristic options which a player can choose in order to realistically develop their own animal species, some of which detail physical characteristics, disease immunity, fertility, and overall dexterity. There are additional genetic options available as the gamer unlocks and utilizes new environments and events in-game.

Development
The game was crowdfunded on Kickstarter. It was inspired by Creatures, Spore, and Don't Starve.  It is available on Steam in early access.  The world and all the animals are procedurally generated. The game was released out of early access on 21 September 2017.

Reception 
Critics at Metascore found the game to be a charismatic infusion of simulation and creative freedom that is strategy-based and fun. Users enjoy the ability to create and develop their own animal tribes while finding ways to best grow their numbers and ultimately keep their tribes thriving. This is a brain game that takes a fun look at serious topics like climate change and  disease spread and bases much of its content on real genetic researching. It's a great game that makes using your brain for conservation fun and environmentally smart.

This game, though thought-provoking, has not found favor with every game player. Zachary Miller, an Associate Editor with Nintendo World Report, states that the game seems geared more towards science and learning than about gaming at all.  Miller likens this genetics driven game to "North Star Games, "Evolution" tabletop game, and wonders where the creative charm is, and notes that the format is clearly developed for PC play and not handheld action because of the many "mouse over" prompts that are filtered into the menu. In a nutshell, Miller finds the game to be generic in totality and fairly uninteresting.

References

External links
Official website

2017 video games
Indie video games
Kickstarter-funded video games
Linux games
MacOS games
Biological simulation video games
Video games about evolution
Video games developed in Switzerland
Windows games